Yankev-Meyer Zalkind (August 16, 1875 - December 1937) was a British Orthodox rabbi, an anarcho-communist, a close friend of Rudolf Rocker, and an active anti-militarist.

He was born in Lithuania, and both his merchant father and mother were both descendants of numerous famous rabbis. Zalkind was well versed in Jewish texts, and was a graduate of the Volozhin yeshiva, where he learned with Hayim Nahman Bialik. He also had a broad education and he was knowledgeable in over 20 languages and was able to write about a dozen with ease. He also obtained a doctorate in philosophy.

His early political leanings were as a Zionist, and was active in his attempts to help set up a settlement in Israel, and to that end studied agronomy. However in 1916 he became an opponent of the war and returned to London to campaign as an anti-militarist.

Zalkind became an anti-Zionist and wanted to create an anarchist society in Mandatory Palestine where refugees would be welcomed.

Rabbi Zalkind was also a prolific Yiddish writer and a prominent Torah scholar, who authored a few volumes of commentaries on the Talmud. He believed, that the ethics of the Talmud, if properly understood, is closely related to anarchism.

Notes

1875 births
1937 deaths
20th-century British male writers
20th-century British rabbis
Anarcho-communists
Anti-Zionist Orthodox rabbis
Authors of works on the Talmud
British Jewish writers
British Orthodox rabbis
English anarchists
English people of Lithuanian-Jewish descent
Orthodox Jewish anarchists
Lithuanian Orthodox rabbis
Orthodox Jewish socialists
People from Kobryn
Yiddish-language writers